Amy Hānaialiʻi Gilliom is an American  vocalist and songwriter.

Hanaialiʻi is a six-time Grammy Award Nominee. She is best known for reinvigorating the Hawaiian tradition of female falsetto singing.

Her album Generation Hawaii won four Nā Hōkū Hanohano Awards in 2007 for Album of the Year, Hawaiian Album of the Year, Female Vocalist of the Year and Best Engineered Album.

The Na Hoku Hanohano Awards are the Hawaii recording industry's regional equivalent of the Grammy Awards. Gilliom was also one of the five finalists for the 2006 Grammy Award for best Best Hawaiian Music Album but did not win. She performed, recorded, and toured for several years with fellow Hawaiian music artist Willie K, the producer of her first hit album, "Hawaiian Tradition". The two also had a personal relationship, which ended in 2001.

In 2013, the singer joined Willie K. to sing "Imagine" by John Lennon at the signing of the Hawaii Marriage Equality Act by Gov. Neil Abercrombie, which made Hawaii the 15th state in the U.S. to legalize same-sex marriage. In 2014, Gilliom announced a forthcoming recording "Reunion" with Willie K. She was selected to serve on the Board of Directors for the Native Arts and Cultures Foundation and Abercombie proclaimed Oct. 15 to be Amy Hanaialiʻi and Willie K. Day in Hawaii.

In 2014 Hanaialiʻi launched her own line of Wine & Champagne with distribution throughout the USA.

In 2014, Hanaialiʻi Gilliom starred as Eva Perón in the musical Evita on Maui.

Early years
When growing up, Gilliom, her father (Lloyd), her mother (Mimi) and her brother were all involved with the Maui Youth Theater, now known as the Maui Academy of Performing Arts.  

Her first album, Native Child (Mountain Apple Company MACD 2030), was released in 1995. "Hawaiian Tradition" (MACD 2040), her second album, was recorded and released in 1997.

Hanaialiʻi carries the legacy of her grandmother Jennie Napua Woodd. In the 1930s, her grandmother performed in New York City's famed Lexington Hotel, which was home of the original "Hawaiian Room". The Hawaiian Room ran for 60 years and sold out seven nights a week. Hanaialiʻi's grandmother performed at the Hawaiian Room for many years. Her brother Eric Gilliom is also a performer and she has performed with him professionally.

References

External links

 Web Site
 fansite
 Amy Gilliom performer at Hawai‘i Romance Festival 2008
 Amy Gilliom performing at Pops Festival 2012

Living people
American female dancers
Dancers from Hawaii
American women singers
Songwriters from Hawaii
Singers from Hawaii
Native Hawaiian people
People from Maui
Year of birth missing (living people)
United States International University alumni
Mountain Apple Company artists
Na Hoku Hanohano Award winners
21st-century American women